Asmita English Secondary School is a private school situated in Karyabinayak municipality-2, Bhaisepati, Lalitpur, Nepal. It was established in 1996 AD by the co-operation of Minraj Dulal and Mitha  Ram. The current principal of A.E.S is Mr. Dipak Dulal.

Buildings
There are three buildings of A.E.S, they are Block-A, Block-B,  Block-C. Block-A consists from grade 2 to grade 6.Block-B consists from nursery to grade 1.Block-C consists from grade 7 to grade 10.

See also
 List of schools in Nepal
 School Leaving Certificate (Nepal)

References

Secondary schools in Nepal
Educational institutions established in 1996
1996 establishments in Nepal